Krystian Popiela (19 January 1998 – 9 September 2018) was a Polish professional footballer who played as a striker.

Career
Born in Tarnów, Popiela began his early career with Fivos Varis, Olympiacos, Białe Orły and Polonia Warsaw, before joining Italian club Cagliari in January 2016. He later played for Wisła Płock, Olimpia Grudziądz, Unia Tarnów and Stal Rzeszów.

Personal life
Popiela was a son of Jarosław Popiela, who made 134 appearances in the Ekstraklasa.

Death
He died in a car crash on 9 September 2018, at the age of 20.

References

1998 births
2018 deaths
Polish footballers
Olympiacos F.C. players
Polonia Warsaw players
Cagliari Calcio players
Wisła Płock players
Olimpia Grudziądz players
Unia Tarnów players
Stal Rzeszów players
Ekstraklasa players
I liga players
Association football forwards
Polish expatriate footballers
Polish expatriate sportspeople in Greece
Expatriate footballers in Greece
Polish expatriate sportspeople in Italy
Expatriate footballers in Italy
Road incident deaths in Poland
Sportspeople from Tarnów